Malcolm Murray Worrall (born 10 December 1925) is a former Australian rules footballer who played with Hawthorn in the Victorian Football League (VFL).

Notes

External links 

		
1925 births
Living people		
Australian rules footballers from Victoria (Australia)		
Hawthorn Football Club players